Koni Iguan (born 6 June 1969) is a Papua New Guinea politician. He has been a Pangu Party member of the National Parliament of Papua New Guinea since 2017, representing the Markham Open electorate. He formerly held the same seat from 2007 to 2012.

He was first elected in the 2007 general election.

In January 2010, he called the 2010 Papua New Guinea bus crash "the most horrific accident" ever witnessed and described it as "This is the nastiest and bloodiest of accidents on the highway".

He was defeated at the 2012 election, but won back his old seat as a Pangu Party candidate at the 2017 election.

References

Living people
Members of the National Parliament of Papua New Guinea
1969 births